Pony Ride is the fourth and the last studio album by Finnish Britpop band The Crash, released on 27 September 2006.

Track listing

Band members
Teemu Brunila – vocals, guitar, keyboard
Samuli Haataja – bass guitar
Erkki Kaila – drums
Tomi Mäkilä – keyboards

Chart positions

References

2006 albums
The Crash (band) albums